Alex Vatanka is a senior fellow and director of the Iran program at the Middle East Institute in Washington D.C. He specializes in Iranian domestic and regional policies. He is also a senior fellow in Middle East Studies at the US Air Force Special Operations School at Hurlburt Field and teaches as an adjunct professor at Wright-Patterson AFB. Alex maintains an official website at https://www.vatanka.com/.

Career 
As a fellow at Middle East Institute, Vatanka's research covers Iranian foreign and domestic affairs, with emphasis on Iran-US relations. Vatanka has offered analysis on the Joint Comprehensive Plan of Action signed between the P5+1 and Iran in July at a panel event held by MEI. Prior to the Joint Comprehensive Plan of Action, he described what he believes are the likely outcomes of a deal with Iran in an op-ed with The National Interest. With Israel's security concerns regarding a nuclear Iran, Vatanka had been covering the development of the Iranian missile program, and Iran's capability in striking Israel and surrounding countries in the region. He was a key speaker at a briefing held by AIPAC, further discussing Iran's political landscape and its impact on regional stability and security.

Vatanka has not usually been targeted by the hawkish state-run media in Iran, but his writings on the Iranian Green opposition movement in 2009–2010 led to some personal attacks by hardliners in Tehran, including by Kayhan, the top state-run newspaper, which at one point accused him of being a collaborator with Western intelligence services.

Concentration(s) 
With Iran's geopolitical strategies in the region in the recent decades, Vatanka was asked to testify before House Committee on Foreign Affairs – Subcommittee on Europe and Eurasia, regarding "Iranian influence in Southern Caucasus and the Surrounding Region." He described the unfolding of events in the Caucasus and made the following conclusion at the hearing:

"Iran's influence in the South Caucasus does not match its proximity or historical ties to the region. Tehran insistence on building relations on an ideological and anti-Western platform is a failed policy. This is best symbolized by the poor state of relations between Iran and Azerbaijan. And it goes beyond bilateral ties. Thanks to its ideological intransigence, Tehran has removed
itself as a contender in Caspian Basin energy bonanza. When Tehran has been able to make inroads in the region - specifically in Armenia and less so in Georgia - it has done so overwhelmingly because those states lack alternatives and not because of a convincing Iranian message."

He later wrote an article about Iran's recent approach to the Caucasus region since the coming of power of Iran's newly elected president, Hassan Rouhani. Vatanka was a conference speaker at the Center for Strategic and International Studies.

Vatanka has been a proponent of dialogue between the US and states in the Caucasus and Central Asia, arguing that Washington is better placed to shape domestic and foreign policies of those countries by remaining actively engaged with states such as Azerbaijan, Georgia and Kazakhstan. In 2015, he visited Kazakhstan as an election observer. That election was condemned as unfair by some in the United States and Vatanka was criticized for his decision to go to the country.

Publications and books

Vatanka's most recent book, "The Battle of the Ayatollahs in Iran: The United States, Foreign Policy and Political Rivalry since 1979," was published by I.B. Tauris in May 2021.

In 2015 he published Iran and Pakistan: Security, Diplomacy and American Influence, covering the history of relations between Iran and Pakistan from 1947 to present day. Though the book has yet to be widely critiqued, initial commentaries were well received by academician and scholars alike, including reviews from Bruce Riedel of the Brookings Institution and R.K. Ramazani, Professor Emeritus of Foreign Affairs at University of Virginia.

Vatanka's other notable and controversial publications include:
 Ali Khamene'í: Iran's Most Powerful Man,
 The Guardian of Pakistan's Shia,
 The Making of an Insurgency in Iran's Balochistan Province
 Iran's Yemen Play
 Iran: Peacemaker in the Caucasus?
 The Islamic Republic's Cross-Sectarian Outreach

References 

Living people
International relations scholars
Writers on the Middle East
Alumni of the University of Sheffield
Alumni of the University of Essex
1975 births
Iranian expatriates in Denmark
Iranian expatriate academics
Iranian expatriates in England
Iranian expatriates in the United States